The Standard Coosa-Thatcher Company was a textile corporation founded in Piedmont, Alabama in 1891. It was publicly traded beginning in 1922. The firm is important because of its endurance for nearly a century and its expansion throughout the southeast United States and into the western United States.

History of textile business

Standard Coosa-Thatcher Company made a significant addition to its Chattanooga, Tennessee mill in 1925. It operated thirteen plants in California, North Carolina, Alabama, Tennessee, and Georgia. In 1981 the enterprise generated $175.5 million in sales and net income of $1.5 million or $2.82 per share.

Owners of the concern agreed to be acquired by a group of company executives, with additional funding from Wolsey & Company, a New York City investment firm, in April 1982.
They resolved to reject a bid from Chicago, Illinois investor Clyde W. Engle, who offered $60 per share. Stockholders continued to debate whether to accept the $53 per share offered by Standard Coosa-Thatcher officials in July 1982

See also
Sauquiot Spinning Company

References

Textile companies of the United States
American companies established in 1891
Manufacturing companies established in 1891
Manufacturing companies disestablished in 1982
Defunct manufacturing companies based in Alabama